Phyllonorycter hostis is a moth of the family Gracillariidae. It is known from Italy, Serbia, North Macedonia, Montenegro and Tunisia. There are some records from Great Britain and Germany.

There are four generations per year in Italy.

The larvae feed on Cydonia, Malus domestica, Prunus avium, Prunus persica, Pyrus communis and Sorbus torminalis. They mine the leaves of their host plant. They create a lower-surface tentiform mine, with several longitudinal folds. There may be up to 40 mines on a single apple leaf. The larvae seem to prefer apple growing in orchards.

References

hostis
Moths described in 2007
Moths of Europe
Moths of Africa